Open Loop New York was a hop on hop off, open top double-decker bus, sightseeing tour company based in New York City. It was a subsidiary of the RATP Group.

History
Open Tour New York commenced operating on May 14, 2014 with 15 open top buses. As part of a global rebranding, it was renamed Open Loop New York on September 3, 2014. It ceased operations in 2017 with operations incorporated into those of Big Bus Tours.

Operations
Open Loop New York operated four routes: The Uptown, Downtown, Night and Midtown Route, each with stops at tourist destinations, including: Times Square, SoHo, Manhattan, Central Park, Empire State Building, Little Italy, Brooklyn, United Nations, Greenwich Village, Columbus Circle, Harlem, Washington Square Park and Bryant Park.

Open Loop New York also operated New York sightseeing tour packages that include Helicopter tours, the Ripley's Believe it or Not Museum, Statue of Liberty cruises and the Metropolitan Museum of Art.

Fleet
Open Loop New York operated a fleet of 36 Alexander Dennis Enviro400s and Gilligs.

References

External links

Company website
RATP/Open Loop New York

Bus transportation in New York City
RATP Group
Transport companies established in 2014
2014 establishments in New York City
2017 disestablishments in New York (state)